Sandoval County is located in the U.S. state of New Mexico. As of the 2020 census, the population was 148,834, making it the fourth-most populous county in New Mexico. The county seat is Bernalillo.

Sandoval County is part of the Albuquerque metropolitan area.

History
Sandoval County was created in 1903 from the northern part of Bernalillo County. Its name comes from one of the large land-holding Spanish families in the area. The original county seat was Corrales, but it was moved to Bernalillo in 1905.

Mormon Battalion Monument (New Mexico) is in the county.

Geography

A relatively small portion of the county exists as a geographically separate exclave between Los Alamos County and Santa Fe County. This came about when Los Alamos County was created; the land that became the exclave would have been part of Los Alamos but was excluded owing to its sacred status among the local Indians. Rather than be ceded to neighboring Santa Fe (or Los Alamos) it has remained part of Sandoval.

Adjacent counties
 Rio Arriba County - north
 Los Alamos County - northeast (west of the exclave)
 Santa Fe County - east (in two locations near Los Alamos County including the exclave)
 Bernalillo County - south
 Cibola County - southwest
 McKinley County - west
 San Juan County - northwest

Native American Reservations

Sandoval County has 12 Indian reservations and two joint-use areas lying within its borders. This is the second highest number of reservations of any county in the United States (after San Diego County, California, which has 18 reservations.) Riverside County, California also has 12 reservations, but no joint-use areas.
 Cochiti Pueblo (partly in Santa Fe County)
 Jemez Pueblo
 Jicarilla Apache Indian Reservation (partly in Rio Arriba County)
 Laguna Pueblo (partly in Bernalillo, Cibola and Valencia Counties)
 Navajo Nation (extending into six other counties in New Mexico, plus three in Arizona and one in Utah)
 San Felipe Pueblo
 San Felipe/Santa Ana joint use area
 San Felipe/Santo Domingo joint use area
 San Ildefonso Pueblo (partly in Santa Fe County)
 Sandia Pueblo (partly in Bernalillo County)
 Santa Ana Pueblo
 Santa Clara Pueblo (partly in Rio Arriba and Santa Fe counties)
 Santo Domingo Pueblo (partly in Santa Fe County)
 Zia Pueblo

National protected areas
 Bandelier National Monument (part)
 Cibola National Forest (part)
 El Camino Real de Tierra Adentro National Historic Trail (part)
 Kasha-Katuwe Tent Rocks National Monument
 Santa Fe National Forest (part)
 Valles Caldera National Preserve (part)

Demographics

2000 census
As of the 2000 census, there were 89,908 people, 31,411 households, and 23,621 families living in the county. The racial makeup of the county was 65.08% White, 16.28% Native American, 1.71% Black or African American, 0.99% Asian, 0.11% Pacific Islander, 12.37% from other races, and 3.47% from two or more races. 29.40% of the population were Hispanic or Latino of any race.

There were 31,411 households, out of which 38.60% had children under the age of 18 living with them, 57.70% were married couples living together, 12.20% had a female householder with no husband present, and 24.80% were non-families. 19.90% of all households were made up of individuals, and 6.90% had someone living alone who was 65 years of age or older. The average household size was 2.84 and the average family size was 3.29.

In the county, the population was spread out, with 29.60% under the age of 18, 7.50% from 18 to 24, 30.10% from 25 to 44, 22.20% from 45 to 64, and 10.60% who were 65 years of age or older. The median age was 35 years. For every 100 females there were 95.20 males. For every 100 females age 18 and over, there were 91.70 males.

The median income for a household in the county was $44,949, and the median income for a family was $48,984. Males had a median income of $36,791 versus $26,565 for females. The per capita income for the county was $19,174. About 9.00% of families and 12.10% of the population were below the poverty line, including 15.60% of those under age 18 and 9.20% of those age 65 or over.

2010 census
As of the 2010 census, there were 131,561 people, 47,602 households, and 34,548 families living in the county. The racial makeup of the county was 68.0% white, 12.9% American Indian, 2.1% black or African American, 1.5% Asian, 0.1% Pacific islander, 11.5% from other races, and 3.9% from two or more races. Those of Hispanic or Latino origin made up 35.1% of the population. In terms of ancestry, 13.2% were German, 9.3% were Irish, 8.7% were English, and 3.3% were American.

Of the 47,602 households, 37.6% had children under the age of 18 living with them, 53.9% were married couples living together, 12.5% had a female householder with no husband present, 27.4% were non-families, and 22.0% of all households were made up of individuals. The average household size was 2.75 and the average family size was 3.22. The median age was 37.9 years.

The median income for a household in the county was $57,158 and the median income for a family was $65,906. Males had a median income of $48,967 versus $35,101 for females. The per capita income for the county was $25,979. About 8.3% of families and 11.4% of the population were below the poverty line, including 14.0% of those under age 18 and 10.8% of those age 65 or over.

Communities

City
 Rio Rancho

Town
 Bernalillo (county seat)
 Edgewood (part)

Villages
 Corrales
 Cuba
 Jemez Springs
 San Ysidro

Census-designated places

 Algodones
 Cañon
 Cochiti
 Cochiti Lake
 Jemez Pueblo
 La Cueva
 La Jara 
 La Madera
 Peña Blanca 
 Placitas 
 Ponderosa 
 Pueblo of Sandia Village 
 Regina 
 Rio Rancho Estates
 San Felipe Pueblo
 San Luis
 Santa Ana Pueblo 
 Santo Domingo Pueblo
 Torreon 
 Zia Pueblo

Unincorporated community
 Counselor

Politics

Since New Mexico obtained statehood in 1912, Sandoval county has been remarkably accurate in predicting the winner of each presidential race. The only elections where Sandoval County failed to back the overall winner were in 1912 (Theodore Roosevelt won the state on the Bull Moose ticket), 1944, 1968, and 2016. Hillary Clinton won a plurality, but not majority, of votes in Sandoval county in 2016 due to Gary Johnson (who previously served as Governor of New Mexico) winning an abnormally high number of votes that election.

Education
School districts include:
 Albuquerque Public Schools
 Bernalillo Public Schools
 Cuba Independent Schools
 Jemez Valley Public Schools
 Los Alamos Public Schools
 Rio Rancho Public Schools

Bureau of Indian Education (BIE) schools include:
 Jemez Day School
 San Felipe Pueblo Elementary School
 T'siya (Zia) Day School

See also
 National Register of Historic Places listings in Sandoval County, New Mexico

References

 
1903 establishments in New Mexico Territory
Albuquerque metropolitan area